Alfred Fischer (29 August 1881 – 10 April 1950) was a German architect. 

Born in Stuttgart, Alfred Fischer studied from 1900 to 1904 at the Stuttgart Technical University of Architecture under Professor Theodor Fischer (no relation). In 1904 he deferred the 1st State examination and from 1905/1906 worked in Berlin as an assistant for the urban design consultant Ludwig Hoffmann and from 1906 to 1908 with Paul Schultze-Naumburg. In 1909 he became a teacher at the College of Arts and Crafts at the Kunstgewerbeschule Düsseldorf under Wilhelm Kreis. From 1911 to 1933 he led the Essen Arts and Crafts School (later called the Folkwangschule). In 1921 he was awarded a professorship. In 1929 he was awarded an Engineering doctorate from the Hannover Technical University.

Fischer was a member of the German Architects Federation (Bund Deutscher Architekten – BDA) and an executive member of the Deutscher Werkbund (DWB). Apart from his teaching activity he worked freelance as an architect, for some years in partnership with the architect Richard Speidel. 

After the change of power in 1933 to the Nazis, as an advocate of modern architecture (see Neue Sachlichkeit, modernism, Bauhaus) and modern training concepts, he experienced increasing difficulties with the school. He was given time off and soon after moved into premature retirement. Fischer left Essen and moved to Murnau. 

The Ruhrgebiet has Alfred Fischer to thank for numerous buildings, important examples of regional architectural history and also a legacy of acknowledged contributions to industrial culture. 

The title 'Alfred Fischer-Essen' has been given to him to distinguish him from the architect Alfred Fischer who was active at the same time in Karlsruhe. He died at Murnau am Staffelsee in 1950.

Buildings

 Prospect and water tower at Zeche Mont Cenis, 1912–1913, Herne-Sodingen, in the Volkspark
 Factory for the Pit Emil Zeche Königin Elisabeth, 1913, Essen-Frillendorf, Elisabethstraße
 Pit for  I/II, 1912–1914, Hamm-Heessen, Sachsenweg (1922–1925 additional buildings by Fischer), transformed later to the event venue Alfred Fischer Hall
 So-called 'Patriotic Monument', 1913, Essen-Bredeney, in the municipal forest west of Bredeneyer Straße
 Power station 'Vorgebirgszentrale', since 1917: 'Goldenberg-Works (and/or 'Kraftwerk Goldenberg'), for the Rheinisch-Westfälische Elektrizitätswerke AG (RWE), 1913–1914, Hürth-Knapsack
 Pumping plant, Alte Emscher for the Emschergenossenschaft (Emscher Cooperative), 1914, Duisburg-Hamborn-Beeck, Alsumer Straße
 'Volkshaus Rotthausen' (Rotthausen Community Centre), 1919–1920, Gelsenkirchen-Rotthausen, Grüner Weg 3
 Kern House, 1922–1923, Essen-Bredeney, Hohe Buchen 12
 Own House of Alfred Fischer, 1922–1923, Essen-Bredeney, Hohe Buchen 5
 Administration building of AG für Hüttenbetrieb, 1923–1925, Duisburg-Meiderich (Obermeiderich), Emscherstraße 57
 Parish Church of St. Antonius, 1924–1925, Castrop-Rauxel-Ickern, Ickerner Straße 66
 Hans-Sachs-Haus (Office building with shops, concert hall and hotel), 1924–1927, Gelsenkirchen, Ebertstraße / Munkelstraße / Vattmannstraße
 Winding tower for Zeche Königsborn Pit III/IV, 1924–1929, Altenbögge (today now part of Bönen)
 Sachsse House, 1926–1927, Essen-Bredeney, Walter-Sachsse-Weg 8
 Pumping station and smelter for the Emschergenossenschaft, 1927, Duisburg-Hamborn-Schwelgern, Neue Schwelgernstraße 135
 Imhoff House, 1927–1928, Essen, Robert-Schmidt-Straße 8
 Richard Hessberg House, 1928, Essen-Bredeney, Stocksiepen 12
 Administration building for the 'Siedlungsverband Ruhrkohlenbezirk' (today: Regionalverband Ruhr), 1929, Essen, Kronprinzenstraße 35
 Lyseum (today: High School), 1929–1930 (1931?), Essen-Bredeney, Grashofstraße 55/57
 Riding sports hall, 1932, Essen, Wittenbergstraße

Sources

External links
Translated from the German Wikipedia page :de:Alfred Fischer (Architekt).

1881 births
1950 deaths
Architects from Stuttgart
20th-century German architects
People from Garmisch-Partenkirchen (district)